Karl Ferdinand Herzfeld (February 24, 1892 – June 3, 1978) was an Austrian-American physicist.

Education

Herzfeld was born in Vienna during the reign of the Habsburgs over the Austro-Hungarian Empire. "He came from a prominent, recently assimilated Jewish family." His father was a physician and ordinarius professor of obstetrics and gynecology at the University of Vienna.  His mother, Camilla née Herzog, was the daughter of a newspaper publisher and sister of the organic chemist R. O. Herzog.

In 1902, when Herzfeld was 10 years old, he was enrolled in the private Gymnasium Schottengymnasium, which was run by the Benedictine Order of the Roman Catholic Church and had its name derived from the fact that the founders came from Scotland.  He attended this school until 1910, when he began attending the University of Vienna to study physics and chemistry.  In 1912, he took courses at the University of Zurich and the Eidgenössische Technische Hochschule Zürich (ETH).  It was in Zurich he met Otto Stern, who was at the ETH; Herzfeld later credited conversations with Stern for his deeper understanding of thermodynamics.  In 1913, he went to study at the University of Göttingen, after which Herzfeld returned to Vienna, and was granted his doctorate in 1914, under Friedrich Hasenöhrl, who had become Director of the Institute for Theoretical Physics, upon the suicide of Ludwig Boltzmann in 1906.

Herzfeld's doctoral thesis applied statistical mechanics to a gas of free electrons as a model for a theory of metals.  By the time he received his doctorate, he already had published six scientific papers.  In one of them, he attempted to derive a model of the hydrogen atom.  This paper was published in 1912, shortly before Niels Bohr submitted his first paper on the Bohr model of the hydrogen atom.

Upon receipt of his doctorate, Herzfeld volunteered for service in the Austro-Hungarian Army.  World War I broke out shortly thereafter and he served until 1918, rising to the rank of first lieutenant.  Herzfeld's thesis advisor Hasenöhrl was called to serve during World War I and was killed at the front.  During his tenure in the military, Herzfeld published six papers on statistical mechanics applied to problems in physics and chemistry, especially to the structure of matter – gases, liquids, and solids.

After the War, Herzfeld returned to the University of Vienna, however, the University was in such dire financial straits that he moved to Munich in 1919, with the intent of studying analytical chemistry and getting a job in the German chemical industry, which had a highly respected reputation.  First, he was an assistant at the physico-chemical laboratory of Kasimir Fajans at Ludwig Maximilian University of Munich (LMU).  However, once there, he found the challenge of theoretical physics more to his liking.  He became Privatdozent for theoretical physics and physical chemistry at LMU, and therefore was much more associated with Arnold Sommerfeld,  who was ordinarius professor for theoretical physics and Director of the Institute for Theoretical Physics – a prominent organization for the study of atomic and molecular structure.  From 1925, until he left LMU in 1926, he was extraordinarius professor of theoretical physics.  During this time, Linus Pauling did postdoctoral studies with him, and he was the thesis advisor for Walter Heitler, who got his doctorate in 1926.  In 1925, Herzfeld published his book on kinetic theory and statistical mechanics, which became a graduate-level textbook in German-speaking universities.

Career

It was in 1926 that Herzfeld took a visiting professorship at the Johns Hopkins University in Baltimore, Maryland, which developed into a regular faculty position.  During 1930 and 1932, he was a lecturer at  Cooper Union and Fordham University in New York City.

While at Johns Hopkins, Herzfeld did considerable research with the chemist Francis O. Rice, who joined the University as an associate professor the same year Herzfeld arrived. Their 1928 paper considered the role of molecular vibrations in the transfer of energy between ultrasonic waves and gas molecules.  At Johns Hopkins, Herzfeld worked with other European colleagues on the University's physics faculty, namely James Franck and Maria Goeppert-Mayer, who were awarded Nobel Prizes in Physics in 1925 and 1963, respectively.  Franck came to Johns Hopkins after he left Germany in 1933, where he had been ordinarius professor of experimental physics and Director of the Second Institute for Experimental Physics at the University of Göttingen and a close colleague of Max Born, who was Director of the Institute of Theoretical Physics at Göttingen.  Goeppert-Mayer was a student of Born, and she joined the Johns Hopkins faculty in 1931.  Goeppert-Mayer and Herzfeld published articles on states of aggregation and nuclear fusion reactions.  Herzfeld coauthored articles with Franck on photosynthesis, one being after they had both left Johns Hopkins. John Archibald Wheeler, who became a prominent physicist, took his PhD under Herzfeld in 1933.

In 1936, Herzfeld moved to The Catholic University of America in Washington, DC, where he remained until his death in 1978. He received emeritus status in 1969 and stayed active for the rest of his life.

Reasons for Herzfeld leaving Johns Hopkins were described in a letter to Arnold Sommerfeld.  A main reason was the dire financial situation at Johns Hopkins.  However, there were other reasons as well.  One being his relationship with R. W. Wood, a professor of experimental physics and chairman of the physics department, had deteriorated.  Also, J. A. Bearden, another experimentalist, thought there was too much emphasis on theoretical physics and the number of German physicists in the small department was out of balance.  Bearden also suspected that Herzfeld had brought Franck to Johns Hopkins to further Herzfeld's ambitions to be department chairman.  Finally too, Bearden thought Herzfeld had caused dissension in the department over his strong support to promote Göppert-Mayer from research associate in physics to a regular faculty appointment.  While Herzfeld did receive offers from both Fordham University and Catholic University, neither was appealing as they did not have strong research departments.  While talking the situation over with Isaiah Bowman, president of Johns Hopkins, it became clear that the financial difficulties at Johns Hopkins might require downsizing the physics faculty.  With this in mind, Herzfeld accepted the offer from Catholic University.  Herzfeld's teaching responsibilities and salary at Catholic University were about the same as that at Johns Hopkins, but there were additional administrative duties, as he was also chairman of the physics department.

In the late 1940s, Herzfeld increased the attention at Catholic University to quantum-mechanical calculations on the electronic structure of polyatomic molecules, thus establishing a respected position for the University in this field.

In 1959, Herzfeld and Theodore A. Litovitz collaborated on a book, in part, summarizing Herzfeld's thinking on ultrasonics over the 30 plus years since his article with F. O. Rice.  In 1966, Herzfeld published a review article summarizing 50 years of developments in physical ultrasonics.

Personal life
In 1938, Herzfeld married Regina Flannery, who was an instructor of anthropology at Catholic University; by the time she retired in 1970, she had risen to professor and the first woman to head that department.

Herzfeld was a Catholic who had a profound interest in Catholic theology. He received the James Cardinal Gibbons Medal for his contributions to the United States, the Catholic Church, and The Catholic University of America.

Honors
1958 – Elected to the American Academy of Arts and Sciences
1960 – Elected to the National Academy of Sciences
1964 – US Navy's Meritorious Service Citation for his services during World War II

Publications

Articles
Karl F. Herzfeld Über ein Atommodell, das die Balmer'sche Wasserstoffserie aussendet, Sitzungsberichte der Koniglichen Akademie der Wissenschaften Wien 121(2a):593-601 (1912)
Karl F. Herzfeld Zur Elektronentheorie der Metalle, Annalen der Physik (4) 41:27-52 [Herzfeld's doctoral dissertation at Vienna University under the direction of Professor Friedrich Hasenöhrl] (1913)
Karl F. Herzfeld On Atomic Properties Which Make an Element a Metal, Physical Review 29:701-705 (1927)
Karl F. Herzfeld and F. O. Rice Dispersion and absorption of high-frequency sound waves, Physical Review 31:691-95 (1928)
Karl F. Herzfeld and Maria Goeppert-Mayer On the states of aggregation, Journal of Chemical Physics 2:38-45 (1934)
F. O. Rice and Karl F. Herzfeld The Thermal Decomposition of Organic Compounds from the Standpoint of Free Radicals. VI. The Mechanism of Some Chain Reactions',' J. Am. Chem. Soc. 56:284–289 (1934) 
Karl F. Herzfeld and M. Göppert-Mayer On the theory of fusion, Phys. Rev. 46:995-1001 (1935)
Karl F. Herzfeld and James Franck An attempted theory of photosynthesis, J. Chem. Phys. 5:237-51 (1937)
Karl F. Herzfeld and James Franck Contributions to a theory of photosynthesis, J. Phys. Chem. 45:978-1025 (1941)
 Karl F. Herzfeld Electron levels in polyatomic molecules having resonating double bonds, Chemical Reviews 41:233-56 (1947)
Karl F. Herzfeld Nodal surfaces in molecular wave functions Review of Modern Physics 21:527-30 (1949)
Karl F. Herzfeld Fifty Years of Physical Ultrasonics, The Journal of the Acoustical Society of America Volume 39, Issue 5A, pp. 813–825, The Catholic University of America, Washington, D. C. (Received 27 July 1965)

Books
Karl F. Herzfeld Zur Elektronentheorie der Metalle (Barth, 1913)
Karl F. Herzfeld Physikalische und Elektrochemie In Encyklopädie der Mathematischen Wissenschften mit Einschluss ihrer Anwendungen Band V, Heft 6, pp. 947–1112 (Leipzig: B. G. Teubner, 1921)
Karl F. Herzfeld Grösse und Bau der Moleküle In Handbuch der Physik 1st ed., band 22, ed. A. Smekal, pp. 386–519 (Berlin: Springer-Verlag, 1924) (second ed., band 24, 1933, pp. 1–252).
Karl F. Herzrfeld, Kinetische Theorie der Wärme In Müller-Pouillets Lehrbuch der Physik Band 3 (Braunsweig: F. Viewig und Sohn, 1925)
Karl F. Herzfeld Klassische Thermodynamik In Handbuch der Physik 1st ed., Band 9, pp. 1–140 (Berlin, Springer-Verlag, 1926)
Karl F. Herzfeld and K. L. Wolf Absorption und dispersion In Handbuch der Physik 1st ed., Band 20, pp. 480–634 (Berlin: Springer-Verlag, 1928)
Karl F. Herzfeld Gittertheorie der festen Körper In Handbuch der Experimental Physik Band 7, eds. W. Wien and F. Harms, pp. 325–422 (Leipzig: Akademische Verlagsgesellschaft, 1928)
Karl F. Herzfeld and H. M. Smallwood The kinetic theory of gases and liquids In A Treatise on Physical Chemistry 2nd ed., vol. 1, ed. H. S. Taylor, pp. 73–217  (New York: Van Nostrand, 1931)
Karl F. Herzfeld and H. M. Smallwood Imperfect gases and the liquid state In A Treatise on Physical Chemistry 2nd ed., vol. 1, ed. H. S. Taylor, pp. 219–250 (New York: Van Nostrand, 1931)
Karl F. Herzfeld Relaxation phenomena in gases In Thermodynamics and Physics of Matter vol. 1, ed. F. Rossini, pp. 646–735 (Princeton, N.J.: Princeton University Press, 1955)
Karl F. Herzfeld and V. Griffing Fundamental physics of gases In Thermodynamics and Physics of Matter vol. 1, ed. F. Rossini, pp. 111–176 (Princeton, N.J.: Princeton University Press, 1955)
Karl F. Herzfeld and Theodore A. Litovitz Absorption and Dispersion of Ultrasonic Waves. Pure and Applied Physics Volume 7, (Academic Press, 1959)
Karl F. Herzfeld Fundamental Physics of Gases (Princeton University Press, 1961)
Karl F. Herzfeld Questions in Statistical Mechanics: Some Reactionary Viewpoints by Karl F Herzfeld (Center for Theoretical Studies, University of Miami, 1971)

Notes

References
Mehra, Jagdish, and Helmut Rechenberg The Historical Development of Quantum Theory. Volume 5 Erwin Schrödinger and the Rise of Wave Mechanics. Part 1 Schrödinger in Vienna and Zurich 1887–1925. (Springer, 2001)

External links
Karl Herzfeld - Biographical Memoir
Herzfeld archives - Catholic University

1892 births
1978 deaths
University of Vienna alumni
University of Zurich alumni
Scientists from Vienna
Austrian emigrants to the United States
Austrian Jews
Austrian Roman Catholics
Austrian people of World War I
Austrian physicists
Austrian nuclear physicists
20th-century American physicists
American people of Austrian-Jewish descent
American nuclear physicists
Jewish American scientists
Johns Hopkins University faculty
Fordham University faculty
Cooper Union faculty
Catholic University of America School of Arts and Sciences faculty
Members of the United States National Academy of Sciences
Fellows of the American Physical Society
Austro-Hungarian expatriates in Switzerland